The Encyclopædia Britannica Second Edition (1777–1784) is a 10-volume reference work, an edition of the Encyclopædia Britannica. It was developed during the encyclopaedia's earliest period as a two-man operation founded by Colin Macfarquhar and Andrew Bell, in Edinburgh, Scotland, and was sold unbound in subscription format over a period of 7 years. Most of the medical and scientific articles, as well as the minor articles, were written by James Tytler. All copperplates were created by Bell.

Vol 1. A 1778;
Vol 2. A-B 1778;
Vol 3. C 1778;
Vol 4. D-F 1779;
Vol 5. G-J 1780;
Vol 6. K-L 1780;
Vol 7. M-O 1781;
Vol 8. O-P 1781;
Vol 9. P-S 1782;
Vol 10. S-Z 1783, with a 204-page appendix, 1784.

Historical context
The second edition is especially interesting to the American reader, as it was written during the course of the American Revolutionary War. Volume 1 was written when New York City was occupied by the British Army, and the course of the war was still quite undecided. Volume 10 was written the year after Cornwallis capitulated and sovereignty was recognized. In the article Colonies, page 2072-2080 Tytler goes into great detail about the British colonies in America and the causes of the revolution, and treats it with an unsympathetic yet neutral, scholarly viewpoint.  Volumes written early, such as volume 2 in the article Boston, where mention is made of "the present American war," and volume 4 in the article New England (under E for England), have these places described as British colonies. In volume 10, written at the end of the war, the article Virginia describes it as "Late one of the British colonies, now one of the United States of North America." Later in that same volume, in the article New York (listed under Y for York), the correctly named "United States of America" is mentioned.

Collaboraters
After the success of the first edition, the second was a more ambitious project, with the addition of history and biography articles. Smellie, editor of the first edition, declined the job for the second, principally because he objected to the addition of biography. Macfarquhar took over the role himself, aided by pharmacist James Tytler, M.A., who was known as an able writer and willing to work for a very low wage. Macfarquhar and Bell rescued Tytler from Holyrood Palace, a debtors' prison, and employed him for seven years at 17 shillings per week. Tytler was a polymath, educated by his father in classic languages and theology, and at Edinburgh in medicine, surgery, pharmacy, and chemistry. He wrote many science and history articles and almost all of the minor articles; by Robert Burns' estimate, Tytler wrote over three-quarters of the second edition. On subjects in which he was not expert, he would copy and paste from contemporary sources. For example, on articles related to Law, such as Corporation, he took large sections of text from William Blackstone's Commentaries on the Laws of England. In compiling the many biographical articles, he borrowed heavily from Biographia Britannica and other sources, often copying word-for-word. His experience and livelihood in surgery and pharmacy led to his authoring unusually long articles in those fields, as well as related subjects such as chemistry and medicine, but he also wrote long articles for, "Electricity" and "Optics," which were outside his field. He was a gifted writer, being in charge of editing the copy and galleys himself, and helping typeset in the printing room. He would sometimes write without using any sort of manuscript, simply setting type as he wrote. In fact, Burns described him as being a printer by trade.

Others contributed to the second edition as well. In the Supplement to the 3rd edition, published in 1803, the following quote appears in the article Dr. Thomas Blacklock:

Tytler's efforts for the article "Brewing" (of beer) were so substantial that it remained unchanged until the 7th edition (1842), carried over from the 6th edition's Supplement.

Articles

Length
Compared to the 1st edition, the second had five times as many long articles (150), including "Scotland" (84 pages), "Optics" (132 pages), and "Medicine" (309 pages), the last two of which had their own indices. It was published in 181 numbers from 21 June 1777 to 18 September 1784; these numbers were bound into ten volumes dated 1778–1783, having 8,595 pages and 340 plates, again engraved by Andrew Bell. A pagination error caused page 8000 to follow page 7099.

Maps
Eighteen maps are found in the "Geography" article. Other maps are found under "South Sea," "Wind,".

Accuracy
The second edition improved greatly upon the 1st, but is still notable for the large amount of archaic information it contains. For example, "Chemistry" goes into great detail on an obsolete system of what would now be called alchemy, in which earth, air, water and fire are named elements containing various amounts of phlogiston. Tytler also describes the architecture of Noah's Ark in detail (illustrated with a copperplate engraving) and, following Bishop Ussher, includes a remarkably precise chronology for the Earth, beginning with its creation on 23 October 4004 B.C. and noting that the Great Flood of 2348 B.C. lasted for exactly 777 days. The 2nd edition also reports a cure for tuberculosis:

and a somewhat melancholy article on "Love" that persisted in the Britannica for nearly a century (until its 9th edition):

In the second edition, the article "History" was written by Adam Ferguson and/or Tytler. Folded into the article there is a plate, colored by hand, showing a timeline of history. It begins at the flood of Noah and numbers the years from the creation of the world, giving the Nativity of Jesus as the year 4004, and it includes timelines for different regions of the world. Ferguson explains the chart at the bottom.

Supplement
A 204-page supplement to the second edition, called the Appendix, was written in 1784 and is bound at the end of Vol. 10. It does not have its own title page, but merely follows, with pagination continuing from 8996 to 9200. The supplement introduces articles on Entomology, Ichthyology, Weather, Hindus (spelled Gentoos), and others, and contains many new biographies, including one of Captain James Cook. It curiously contains 25 new pages on Air, which give very little new information about air itself, but mainly cover hot air ballooning, one of Tytler's hobbies. The first page of the supplement begins with the words "Appendix containing articles omitted and others further explained or improved, together with corrections of errors and of wrong references." The supplement also includes 10 plates, namely CCCXIV to CCCXXIII. Volume 10 is therefore much thicker than the others, and contains over 1100 pages, the other 9 volumes having 800 each.

Sales
Sales figures for the second edition are not known precisely. Kerr, biographer of the first edition's editor William Smellie, estimated that only 1,500 copies had been produced. But Edinburgh book wholesaler Charles Elliot sold 1,500 sets alone in less than a year. On the other hand, Archibald Constable, who bought Britannica in 1812 and had been distributing them since 1788, wrote that 4,500 copies had been made.

Like the first edition, the second was sold in sections by subscription at the printing shop of Colin MacFarquhar. When finished in 1784, remaining numbers were collected and sold as complete sets by book wholesaler Charles Elliot as his bookshop in Edinburgh for 10 pounds, unbound, and the second edition was enough of a financial success that a more ambitious third edition was begun a few years later.

References

1777 non-fiction books
1777 in Scotland
18th-century encyclopedias
02
Book series introduced in 1777